Trematocara marginatum is a species of cichlid endemic to Lake Tanganyika.  This species can reach a length of  TL.

References

marginatum
Fish described in 1899
Taxonomy articles created by Polbot